The Coe House in Burkesville, Kentucky, located at 433 N. Main St., was built in 1908.  It was listed on the National Register of Historic Places in 2009.

In 2018 the house is on offer for sale, listed at $129,000.  One bedroom has been open as a bed and breakfast, with the owner and family living in another part of the house.

References

Houses on the National Register of Historic Places in Kentucky
Houses completed in 1908
National Register of Historic Places in Cumberland County, Kentucky
1908 establishments in Kentucky